Lasser or Lässer is a Germanic surname; it may refer to:

 David Lasser (1902–1996), US-American science fiction author
 Philip Lasser (born 1963), US-American composer, pianist, and music theorist
 Louise Lasser (born 1939), US-American actress
 Mitchel Lasser, American lawyer
 Robin Lässer (born 1991), German motorcycle racer
 Tobías Lasser (1911–2006), Venezuelan botanist